Hinton is an unincorporated community in Boone County, in the U.S. state of Missouri. It is located just north of Columbia.

History
A post office called Hinton was established in 1885, and remained in operation until 1907. The community was named after John W. Hinton, a 19th-century county judge.

References

Unincorporated communities in Boone County, Missouri
Unincorporated communities in Missouri